Johannes Teutonicus may refer to:

 John of Wildeshausen, called Johannes Teutonicus (ca. 1180–1252) - Master General of the Dominican order
 Johannes Teutonicus Zemeke (d. 1245) - glossator on the Decretum Gratiani, see Glossa Ordinaria